The Bukovina Germans ( or Buchenlanddeutsche), also known and referred to as Buchenland Germans, are a German ethnic group which settled in Bukovina, a historical region situated at the crossroads of Central and Eastern Europe. They are part of the Romanian Germans.

Their main demographic presence lasted from the last quarter of the 18th century, when Bukovina was annexed by the Habsburg Empire, until 1940, when nearly all Bukovina Germans (or approximately 100,000 people) were forcefully resettled into either Nazi Germany or Nazi-occupied regions in Central-Eastern Europe as a part of the Heim ins Reich national socialist population transfer policy.

Nowadays, most of the Bukovina Germans still left in Bukovina live in the bigger urban settlements of Suceava and Rădăuți in Suceava County as well as sparsely throughout other rural settlements in the center and southwest of the county. Otherwise, a significant Bukovina German diaspora can be found in Germany and Austria as well as in North America (more specifically in the United States and Canada) and South America (for example, in Argentina).

Historical overview 

According to the 1910 Imperial Austrian census (which recorded inhabitants according to language), the Bukovina Germans represented an ethnic minority accounting for approximately 21.2% of the multi-ethnic population of the Duchy of Bukovina. Of those 21.2%, a large proportion was represented by German-speaking Jews. Excluding the Jews from this figure, however, the Germans in Bukovina constituted a minority of approximately 73,000 people (or 9.2%).

Subsequently, in absolute numbers, 75,533 ethnic Germans (or about 9% of the population) were registered in Bukovina when it was still part of the Kingdom of Romania (as per the Romanian population census of 1930). Historically, some of them developed their own dialect over the course of several hundred years which they called Buchenländisch, while others speak a series of other distinct German dialects, depending on their region of origin.

After the end of World War II, several thousand ethnic Germans still remained in southern Bukovina (according to an estimate  7,500), but many of them emigrated to West Germany before the fall of communism in Romania in 1989. In addition, few resettled Germans returned as well.

To this day, sparse and very small rural and urban communities of Germans (a few dozen to hundred persons) still reside in southern Bukovina (i.e., Suceava County in Romania) and are politically represented by the Democratic Forum of Germans in Romania (FDGR/DFDR). Lastly, another interesting aspect on the German presence in Bukovina is the fact that the historical/geographic region as a whole has been previously sometimes labeled as 'Switzerland of the East'. In one particular interpretation, it can be mentioned that the Zipser Germans in the southwest of Suceava County can also be included within the overall Bukovina German community still remaining and living in the county.

History

Initial settlement during the Middle Ages (13th century to 14th century) 

Ethnic Germans known as Transylvanian Saxons (who were mainly craftsmen and merchants stemming from present-day Luxembourg and Rhine-Moselle river area of Western Europe), had sparsely settled in the western mountainous regions of the Principality of Moldavia over the course of the late medieval Ostsiedlung migration (which, in this particular case, took place throughout the 13th and 14th centuries).

These settlers encouraged trade and urban development. Additionally, they founded (and were also briefly in charge under the title of Schultheiß) of some notable medieval settlements such as Baia, the first capital of the Principality of Moldavia, or Târgu Neamț. Subsequently, most of them had been gradually assimilated in these local cultures by the dominant ethnic group of Romanians.

Under the Habsburgs and within the Austrian Empire (1774–1918)

Following the Russo-Turkish War, in 1774–75, as per the Treaty of Küçük Kaynarca, the Habsburg monarchy annexed northwestern Moldavia which was predominantly inhabited by Romanians (as many as 85 percent), with smaller numbers of Ukrainians (including Hutsuls and Ruthenians), Armenians, Poles, and Jews.

Since then, the region has been known as Bukovina. From 1774 to 1786, the settlement of German craftsmen and farmers in existing villages increased. The settlers included Zipser Germans from the Zips region of Upper Hungary (today mostly Slovakia), Banat Swabians from Banat, and ethnic Germans from Galicia (more specifically Evangelical Lutheran Protestants), but also immigrants from the Rhenish Palatinate, the Baden and Hesse principalities, as well as from impoverished regions of the Bohemian Forest.

Thus, four distinct German linguistic groups were represented as follows:

 Austrian High German (Österreichisches Hochdeutsch) was spoken in urban centres like Cernăuți (Czernowitz), Rădăuți (Radautz), Suceava (Suczawa), Gura Humorului (Gura Humora), Câmpulung (Kimpolung), and Siret (Sereth);
 Bohemian-Bavarian German (Deutschböhmisch or Böhmerwäldisch) was spoken by woodsmen in Huta Veche (Althütte), Crăsnișoara Nouă (Neuhütte), Gura Putnei (Karlsberg), Voievodeasa (Fürstenthal), Vadu Negrilesei (Schwarzthal), Poiana Micului (Buchenhain), Dealu Ederii (Lichtenberg), Bori (early colony in Gura Humorului), and Clit (Glitt);
 Palatine Rhine Franconian (Pfälzisch) and Swabian German (Schwäbisch) was spoken in farming villages like Arbore (Arbora), Bădeuți (Deutsch Badeutz), Frătăuții Vechi (Alt Fratautz), Frătăuții Noi (Neu Fratautz), Ilișești (Illischestie), Ițcani (Itzkany), Satu Mare (Deutsch Satulmare) and Tereblecea (Tereblestie);
 Zipser German (Zipserisch) was spoken by mine workers and their descendants in Cârlibaba (Mariensee or Ludwigsdorf), Iacobeni (Jakobeny), Stulpicani (Stulpikany), and elsewhere.

During the 19th century, the developing German middle class comprised much of the intellectual and political elite of the region; the language of official business and education was predominantly German, particularly among the upper classes. Population growth and a shortage of land led to the establishment of daughter settlements in Galicia, Bessarabia, and Dobruja.

After 1840, a shortage of land caused the decline into poverty of the German rural lower classes; in the late 19th century parts of the German rural population alongside a few Romanians emigrated to the Americas, mainly to the United States (most notably to Ellis and Hays, both located in Kansas) but also to Canada.

Between 1849 and 1851, and from 1863 to 1918, the Duchy of Bukovina became an independent crown land within the Austrian Empire (see also: Cisleithania). However, at this time, in comparison with other Austrian crown lands, Bukovina remained a relatively underdeveloped region on the periphery of the realm, primarily supplying raw materials. This did not prevent it from being called '[the] Switzerland of the Orient' (i.e., of Eastern Europe) or 'Europe in miniature', due to its ethnic and cultural diversity spread over such a small territory.

The Franz-Josephs-Universität (Francisco-Josephina) in Cernăuți (Czernowitz) was founded in 1875, then the easternmost German-speaking university. In 1910–11, the Bukovinian Reconciliation (a political agreement between the peoples of Bukovina and their political representatives in the Landtag assembly on the question of autonomous regional administration) took place between the representatives of the nationalities. During the first round of the 20th century, local German-language literature flourished through the writings of Rose Ausländer, Alfred Kittner, Alfred Margul Sperber, or Paul Celan. Other notable German writers of Bukovina include mixed Ukrainian-German intellectuals Ludwig Adolf Staufe-Simiginowicz and Olha Kobylianska (who was also remotely related to renowned German poet Zacharias Werner).

Early 20th century and Kingdom of Romania (1918–1939)

From 1918 to 1919, following the end of World War I and the dissolution of the Austro-Hungarian Empire, Bukovina became part of the Kingdom of Romania. At the General Congress of Bukovina held on November 28, 1918, the political representatives of the Bukovina Germans voted and supported the union of Bukovina with the Romanian kingdom, alongside the Romanian and Polish representatives.

From 1933 up until 1940, some German societies and organizations opposed the propaganda of the Third Reich and the National Socialist-aligned so-called 'Reformation Movement'. Beginning in 1938 however, due to the poor economic situation and powerful National Socialist propaganda, a pro-Third Reich mentality developed within the Bukovina German community. Because of this, many increased their preparedness for evacuation.

Outbreak of World War II and Heim ins Reich (1939–1941) 

When Nazi Germany signed the Molotov–Ribbentrop Pact with the Soviet Union (USSR) in 1939 (just before the outbreak of World War II), the fate (unknown to those affected) of the Germans in Bukovina was sealed. In a secret supplementary protocol, it was agreed (among other points) that the northern part of Bukovina would be annexed by the Soviet Union under a territorial re-organization in Central-Eastern Europe, with the German sub-populations therein undergoing compulsory resettlement to other future Nazi-occupied territories. Under this military partitive accord, the Soviet Union occupied northern Romania in 1940.

Consequently, the Third Reich resettled nearly the entire German population of Bukovina (about 96,000 ethnic Germans) to, most notably, Nazi-occupied Poland, where the incoming evacuees were frequently compensated with expropriated farms. From 1941 to 1944, Bukovina was almost entirely Romanian-populated. Additionally, most of the Jewish population ( 30% of the regional population as a whole) were murdered by the Third Reich in collaboration with fascist Romania under Marshal Ion Antonescu during The Holocaust.

In the nearly completely deserted Bukovina German villages during World War II, the local German communities transferred their local architectural heritage (e.g. churches for example) to the Romanian community free of charge and without any conditions.

Resettlement in the wake of World War II (1945–1947) 

In 1944–45, as the Russian front moved closer to the Kingdom of Romania, the Bukovina Germans who were forcefully settled in Polish areas (like the remaining German population), fled westward or wherever they could manage. Some remained in what was to be East Germany while others went to Austria. In 1945, during the last year of war, the 7,500 or so remaining Germans in Bukovina were evacuated to Germany, ending (except for a relatively feeble number of persons) a significant German presence in Bukovina, Romania after 1940. 

During the post-World War II era, the Bukovina Germans, as other 'homeland refugees' (known as Volksdeutche in German), assimilated into the Federal Republic, Austria, or the German Democratic Republic (i.e. East Germany). Nonetheless, small numbers of ethnic Germans (along with their families) returned to Romania after the resettlement plan failed, most notably the Zipser Germans, but also some Bukovina Germans.

After World War II and life under communist Romania (1945–1989) 

After the end of World War II, the German community of Bukovina declined dramatically in numbers, with only several thousand ethnic Germans still residing in Suceava County and a few waves of returning expelled Bukovina Germans re-settling the county. As with the rest of the German community in Bukovina (and in general in Romania for that matter), they were constantly harassed by and under the surveillance of the Securitatea (the approximate equivalent or counterpart of Stasi in East Germany), the secret police in communist Romania, as recorded for the first time in their logs in October 1956. 

The documents of the Romanian communist secret police showcased the fact that many remaining Bukovina Germans expressed their interest to flee the country and immigrate to West Germany. Furthermore, only a few of them had been suspected on the grounds of anti-national sentiment alongside some Ukrainians, as shown by the same reports of the communist Romanian secret police. In the meantime, mixed Romanian-German families formed in this part of Romania as well, as they have formed prior to the end of World War II and the rise of communism as well. However, after 1989, very few Bukovina Germans (including those from mixed families) remained in the county of Suceava, most of them immigrating to West Germany. Nevertheless, some of them return almost on a yearly basis in their ancestral towns of Bukovina.

In contemporary Romania (1989–present) 

During the early 21st century, the German community of Bukovina had dwindled dramatically and is currently on the verge of extinction. Nowadays, according to an estimate, the German community in Suceava County represents 0.3% of the total population of the county.

Most of the rural settlements inhabited by the Bukovina Germans are totally or almost totally devoid of any ethnic Germans still left there and most of their historical heritage (i.e. churches and houses) were given to the local Romanian communities free of charge after most of the Bukovina Germans departed during World War II.

Some of the towns and municipalities of Suceava County, most notably the county seat Suceava, are still home to a larger community of native ethnic Germans compared to the countryside which had been nearly completely deserted by the Bukovina Germans in the wake of World War II and after the fall of the Iron Curtain.

Nevertheless, the local branches of FDGR/DFDR in Suceava County are still functional and many local German culture-based festivals (akin to Haferland week of the Transylvanian Saxons) have been held thus far, with numerous members of the Bukovina German diaspora returning home on their occasion, especially in the town of Suceava. Furthermore, Germany is also the second most important economic partner and foreign investor of Suceava County, as reported by the prefect of the county in 2021.

Demographics 

According to the Austrian census of 1869, there were approximately 40,000 ethnic Germans recorded from a total population of Bukovina of over 500,000 inhabitants. The 1930 Romanian census recorded  75,000 ethnic Germans in Bukovina. According to another source, namely an article of the Romanian Academy from 2019, there were  76,000 ethnic Germans in Bukovina in 1930 and 44% of them lived in urban settlements. Overall, the Bukovina Germans made up 12.46% of the total population of the interwar Suceava County at that time.

As it was during Austrian times, the two largest numbers of German urban dwellers were to be found in Cernăuți (the largest town of Bukovina in Romanian royal times as well) and in Suceava. Other large urban German communities were also present in Rădăuți, Gura Humorului, and Câmpulung Moldovenesc. In rural settlements, the Germans from Bukovina were still more present, especially in the south and south-west of the region, towards the Carpathian Mountains and the Bistrița river valley, where most Zipser Germans had previously settled.

Generally, the Bukovina Germans used to be the dominant ethnic group in several towns in Bukovina throughout the 19th century and early 20th century. After the union of Bukovina with the Kingdom of Romania, for which both all German and Polish representatives in the parliament of the region (previously under Austrian rulership) voted for, the number of urban German dwellers slowly but steadily decreased in the towns yet still remained strong in the countryside, in many waldhufendorfs (i.e. forest villages) which they helped develop.

On the verge of World War II, the vast majority Bukovina Germans were re-settled by Nazi Germany to areas occupied by it in Eastern-Central Europe. After the end of the war, few of these Germans decided to come back. During Communism in Romania, the German community in Bukovina numbered a few thousand and most of them eventually emigrated to West Germany prior to 1989 or to unified Germany after the Romanian Revolution of 1989, leaving a very small number of ethnic Germans still living in Suceava County.

According to the 2011 Romanian census, the German minority in southern Bukovina makes up only 0.11% of the total population (including Zipsers and smaller numbers of Regat Germans in Fălticeni). Consequently, the rural and urban settlements of Suceava County, where small German communities still live to this day, are the following ones (according to the 2011 Romanian census):

 Suceava: 0.18%
 Rădăuți: 0.27%
 Gura Humorului: 0.52%
 Câmpulung Moldovenesc: 0.25%
 Fălticeni: 0.02%
 Mănăstirea Humorului: 1%
 Vatra Moldoviței: 0.25%
 Cârlibaba: 5.06%
 Solca: 0.63%
 Siret: 0.42%
 Vatra Dornei: 0.23%

Religion 

Before the outbreak of World War II, the vast majority of the Bukovina Germans were Roman Catholic. As opposed to the Transylvanian Saxons in neighbouring Transylvania who have been reformed as Evangelical Lutherans since the 16th century (the vast majority of them, that is), the Bukovina Germans were Roman Catholic with Evangelical Lutherans in minority amongst them. When they firstly immigrated to the Midwestern United States during the 1880s, the Bukovina Germans were both Roman Catholic and Evangelical Lutheran settlers.

Flag of the Bukovina Germans 

The flag of the Bukovina Germans is a cultural representation of their regional identity and affiliation with Bukovina, Romania. The flag encloses the coat of arms of the historical region of Bukovina as it was conceived and official during imperial Austrian times.

Culture and cuisine 

The regional culture and cuisine of the Bukovina Germans is very similar to other regional cultures and cuisines of the peoples of Central Europe, in particular, naturally, similar to German and Austrian cuisine. Furthermore, the regional cuisine of the Bukovina Germans is similar to the German-Bohemian cuisine.

In terms of Bukovina German literature, Gregor von Rezzori and Ludwig Adolf Staufe-Simiginowicz are the most well known writers. Simiginowicz wrote Volkssagen Aus Der Bukowina (a compilation of folk songs from the entire region of Bucovina). He also collected fairytales from Bucovina. He was born in Suceava and studied history and German studies in Vienna. A noteworthy German-language poet in Bukovina was Ernst Rudolf Neubauer. Another German-language poet was Olha Kobylianska (who was distantly related to German poet Zacharias Werner).

Historical occupations 

In the passing of time, since the Austrian/Habsburg annexation of Bukovina, the Bukovina Germans had the following main occupations:

 Miners;
 Lumberjacks;
 Farmers;
 Glassmakers;
 Craftsmen.

Even further back in time, the Transylvanian Saxon community which settled in the 14th century on the present-day Suceava County excelled at trade and craftsmanship.

Organisations and cultural institutions 

The political representation of the Bukovina Germans (and of all other German-speaking groups in contemporary Romania) is the DFDR/FDGR which has a local branch operating in Suceava County with headquarters in the town of Suceava. The Union of Germans in Rădăuți is a cultural association which has the seat at the local German House in the town, being presided by Carol Alexander Mohr.

The regional president of FDGR/DFDR Bucovina/Buchenland is Josef-Otto Exner, who is also in charge of the ACI Bukowina Stiftung, a cultural foundation/association aiming to enhance ties between Romania and Germany.

After World War II, the Bukovina Germans who settled in West Germany founded the Landsmannschaft der Buchenlanddeutschen im Bundesrepublik Deutschland (Homeland Association of the Bukovina Germans in the Federal Republic of Germany) which was active from 1949 until 2020. Others, who decided to settle in Austria, founded the Landsmannschaft der Buchenlanddeutschen in Österreich (Homeland Association of the Bukovina Germans in the Federal Republic of Austria).

In the Midwestern United States, more specifically in the state of Kansas, there is a museum of the Bukovina German community, displaying their history on the overseas settlement process. The museum was opened in 1988 in the small town of Ellis. It is currently presided by Doug Reckmann and is similar to the local FDGR/DFDR in Suceava County, Romania in its structure and membership.

Gallery

Notable people 

 Elisabeth Axmann, writer
 Olha Kobylianska (partly Bukovina German), writer
 Otto Babiasch, Olympic boxer
 Viktor Pestek, Auschwitz guard who helped a prisoner escape, for which he was executed in 1944
 Alfred Kuzmany, Nazi general
 Eduard Neumann, Luftwaffe officer
 Stefan Baretzki, Auschwitz guard who murdered more than 8,000 people
 Ewald Burian, military officer
 Franz Des Loges, former mayor of Suceava
 Alfred Eisenbeisser, professional footballer
 Stefan Hantel (partly Bukovina German), musician
 Anton Keschmann, politician in the Imperial Austrian Parliament
 Roman Neumayer, inductee into German Ice Hockey Hall of Fame
 George Ostafi, abstract painter
 Francisc Rainer, physiologist and anthropologist
 Ludovic Iosif Urban Rudescu, biologist
 Gregor von Rezzori (partly Bukovina German), writer
 Roman Sondermajer (partly Bukovina German), physician, surgeon, and associate professor
 Constantin Schumacher (partly German), professional footballer
 Ludwig Adolf Staufe-Simiginowicz (partly Bukovina German), poet and educator
 Joseph Weber, Roman Catholic prelate
 Lothar Würzel, journalist, linguist, and politician
 Hugo Weczerka, regional historian
 Erich Beck, researcher and academician, Doctor Honoris Causa of Ștefan cel Mare University of Suceava

See also 

 List of governors of Bukovina
 List of Landeshauptmann of Bukovina
 Jahn Cernăuți, a bygone German football club in Bukovina
 Vorwärts (i.e. Forward, a bygone German-language newspaper in Bukovina)
 Bukovina Society Headquarters and Museum
 Ellis, Kansas, a Midwestern American town with a sizable Bukovina German community by heritage
 Hays, Kansas, a Midwestern American town with a sizable German community by heritage
 Germans of Romania
 Zipser Germans
 Transylvanian Saxons
 Banat Swabians and Banat Highland Germans
 Bessarabia Germans
 Dobrujan Germans

Further reading 

 Povești din folclorul germanilor din România by Roland Schenn, Corint publishing house, 2014 (in Romanian)

Notes

References

External links 

 Bukovina Society of the Americas, a website of the Bukovina German community from the Midwestern United States, more specifically from Kansas
 Das Mädchen aus dem Wald, a compilation of German fairytales, songs, and local history from Rădăuți area by Claus Stephani

Germanic ethnic groups
German diaspora in Europe
Bukovina-German people
People from Bukovina
Ethnic German groups in Romania
Germany–Romania relations
History of ethnic groups in Romania
Historical ethnic groups of Europe
Romanian people of German descent
Romanian people of Austrian descent
Ukrainian people of German descent